Bernard Monot (born 3 July 1962) is a French economist and politician and Member of the European Parliament representing Massif-central–Centre.

Formerly a member of the National Front (FN), Monot left the party in May 2018 to join Debout la France. Monot cited the FN's support for leaving the eurozone and a lack of attention to social and economic issues as reasons for leaving the party.

References

1962 births
Living people
MEPs for Massif-central–Centre 2014–2019
National Rally (France) MEPs
Debout la France politicians